The Snow Hill Billies were minor league baseball teams based in Williamston, North Carolina. From 1937 to 1940, the Snow Hill Billies played exclusively as members of the Coastal Plain League, winning the 1937 league championship. The Billies played home minor league games at Snow Hill Park.

History
The Snow Hill "Billies" moniker was first used by a semi–pro team that played in a league named the Coastal Plain League prior to minor league play. Bob Bowman was noted to have played for the 1934 team.

Minor league baseball began in Snow Hill, North Carolina in 1937. The 1937 Snow Hill Billies, became charter members of the eight–team Class D level Coastal Plain League. Williamston joined the Ayden Aces, Goldsboro Goldbugs, Greenville Greenies, Kinston Eagles, New Bern Bears, Tarboro Combs and Williamston Martins in playing the first season of Class D level baseball for the league.

Beginning Coastal Plain League play on May 6, 1937, the Snow Hill Billies were the 1937 Coastal Plain League Champions. Snow Hill placed 1st in the 1937 regular season. The Billies ended the season with a record of 62–36, playing under manager D.C. "Peahead" Walker in the eight–team Coastal Plain League. Walker would manage the team for three seasons. The Martins finished 6.0 games ahead of the 2nd place Williamston Martins in the final standings to qualify for the four–team playoffs. Joe Bistroff of Snow Hill led the league with 24 home runs. In the 1st round of the playoffs, Snow Hill defeated New Bern 3 games to 1. In the Finals, Snow Hill defeated the Tarboro Combs 4 games to 1 to win the championship.

Snow Hill manager D.C. "Peahead" Walker was also serving as the Elon College and then the Wake Forest University football coach during the three seasons he managed the team.

Continuing minor league play, the 1938 Snow Hill Billies placed 3rd in the eight–team Coastal Plain League standings and reached the playoff finals. Playing under returning manager D.C. Walker, the Billies finished the 1938 season with a record of 61–49 in Coastal Plain League play. Snow Hill finished 1.0 game behind the 1st place New Bern Bears and 0.5 game behind the 2nd place Tarboro Serpents in the final standings. In the playoffs, Snow Hill defeated Tarboro 4 games to 2 in the 1st round. In the Finals the New Bern Bears defeated Snow Hill 4 games to 0.

The Snow Hill Billies continued play in the 1939 Coastal Plain League, placing 7th. In the regular season, the Billies ended the regular season with a record of 56–64, playing under manager D.C. Walker, finishing 17.0 games behind the 1st place Greenville Greenies. Joe Bistroff of Snow Hill led the league with 32 home runs and 108 RBI. Snow Hill did not qualify for the playoffs, won by the Williamston Martins.

Before the 1940 season, Snow Hill Billies owner Josiah Exum reportedly informed local residents that the franchise was losing money. Exum  felt that the installation of lights at Snow Hill Park could help the franchise survive financially. The Snow Hill population of 900 at the time was an attendance factor. A fund raising drive ensued and lights were purchased and installed, with Exum informing residents on April 2, 1940 that the team would play in the upcoming season.
 
In their final season of play, the 1940 Snow Hill Billies placed 5th in the Coastal Carolina League. Snow Hill ended the season of eight–team league with a record of 62–64, playing under manager Dwight Wall. Snow Hill finished 15.0 games behind the 1st place Wilson Tobs in the final league standings. The Snow Hill franchise folded following the 1940 season, replaced by the Rocky Mount Leafs in the 1941 league play.

After the 1940 season, it was reported that franchise owner sold the newly installed Snow Hill Park lighting system to Elon College. In March 1941, the team franchise roster and the team bus were sold to investors in Rocky Mount, North Carolina for $2,100.

Snow Hill, North Carolina has not hosted another minor league team.

The ballpark
The Snow Hill Billies teams reportedly played home minor league games at Snow Hill Park. It was noted the ballpark was located on Mill Street, beside Contention Creek and prone to flooding.

Timeline

Year–by–year records

Notable alumni

Bob Bowman (1934)
Charlie Frye (1939) 
Al Gettel (1938)
John Hyder (1937)
Aaron Robinson (1937)
Vince Ventura (1937)
D.C. "Peahead" Walker (1937–1939, MGR)

See also
Snow Hill Billies players

References

External links
Baseball Reference

Defunct minor league baseball teams
Baseball teams disestablished in 1940
Baseball teams established in 1937
Defunct baseball teams in North Carolina
Professional baseball teams in North Carolina
Greene County, North Carolina
Coastal Plain League (minor league) teams